Küllo Kõiv (14 July 1972 – 29 June 1998) was an Estonian wrestler. He competed at the 1992 Summer Olympics and the 1996 Summer Olympics.

Kõiv died in an automobile accident in Viljandi in 1998, aged 25.

References

1972 births
1998 deaths
Estonian male sport wrestlers
Olympic wrestlers of Estonia
Wrestlers at the 1992 Summer Olympics
Wrestlers at the 1996 Summer Olympics
People from Viljandi Parish
Road incident deaths in Estonia
20th-century Estonian people